Wrayanna soluta is a species of sea snail, a marine gastropod mollusk in the family Assimineidae. This species is endemic to Micronesia.

References

Fauna of Micronesia
Wrayanna
Assimineidae
Gastropods described in 1897
Taxonomy articles created by Polbot